Venkatesh Netha Borlakunta is an Indian politician and a member of parliament to the 17th Lok Sabha from Peddapalle Lok Sabha constituency, Telangana. He won the 2019 Indian general election being an Telangana Rashtra Samithi candidate. He was studied in Osmania University. Before elections he resigned for his job. He was also a CPS employee and also fought against CPS, leader in CPSTEATS, which was fighting against the CPS system.

References

India MPs 2019–present
Lok Sabha members from Telangana
Living people
Telangana Rashtra Samithi politicians
Year of birth missing (living people)